The 153rd Infantry Brigade, part of the 51st (Highland) Infantry Division, was an infantry brigade of the British Army that fought during both the First and Second world wars. It was raised in 1908, as the 2nd Highland Brigade, upon the creation of the Territorial Force and was later redesignated the 153rd (2nd Highland) Brigade.

Along with its sister brigade, the 152nd Brigade, the 153rd was effectively destroyed when it surrendered at St Valery-en-Caux on 12 June 1940. It was reconstituted from the 27th Infantry Brigade of the 9th (Highland) Infantry Division, which was reorganised in August 1940 as the new 51st Division. It went on to serve in almost all of the major battles in North Africa, Sicily and North-west Europe.

Campaign Honours
Battle of France - 1939-1940 (destroyed)
Battle of El Alamein - 1942
Operation Supercharge - 1942
Operation Pugilist - 1943
Operation Husky - 1943
Operation Overlord - 1944
Operation Astonia - 1944
Battle of the Scheldt - 1944
Battle of the Bulge - 1944/45
Operation Plunder - 1945

Order of battle

First World War
 1/6th Battalion, Black Watch
 1/7th Battalion, Black Watch
 Shetland Companies, Gordon Highlanders
 1/4th Battalion, Gordon Highlanders
 1/5th Battalion, Gordon Highlanders
 1/7th Battalion, Gordon Highlanders

Original 153rd Infantry Brigade (1939-1940)
 4th Battalion, Black Watch
 5th Battalion, Gordon Highlanders
 6th Battalion, Gordon Highlanders

Reconstituted 153rd Infantry Brigade (1940-1945)
 5th Battalion, Black Watch
 1st Battalion, Gordon Highlanders
 5/7th Battalion, Gordon Highlanders

Army Reserve (United Kingdom)
Infantry brigades of the British Army
Infantry brigades of the British Army in World War I
Infantry brigades of the British Army in World War II
Military units and formations established in 1908
Military units and formations of Scotland